The 1974 San Francisco Giants season was the Giants' 92nd season in Major League Baseball, their 17th season in San Francisco since their move from New York following the 1957 season, and their 15th at Candlestick Park. The team finished in fifth place in the National League West with a 72–90 record, 30 games behind the Los Angeles Dodgers.

Offseason 
 December 7, 1973: Juan Marichal was purchased from the Giants by the Boston Red Sox.
 March 19, 1974: Willie Prall was traded by the Giants to the Chicago Cubs for Ken Rudolph.

Regular season

Season standings

Record vs. opponents

Opening Day starters 
Bobby Bonds
Tom Bradley
Tito Fuentes
Dave Kingman
Garry Maddox
Gary Matthews
Steve Ontiveros
Ken Rudolph
Chris Speier

Notable transactions 
 May 25, 1974: Steve Barber was signed as a free agent by the Giants.
 June 5, 1974: 1974 Major League Baseball draft
Alan Wirth was drafted by the Giants in the 3rd round.
Guy Sularz was drafted by the Giants in the 10th round.
Jeff Yurak was drafted by the Giants in the 24th round.
 August 11, 1974: Steve Barber was released by the Giants.

Roster

Player stats

Batting

Starters by position 
Note: Pos = Position; G = Games played; AB = At bats; H = Hits; Avg. = Batting average; HR = Home runs; RBI = Runs batted in

Other batters 
Note: G = Games played; AB = At bats; H = Hits; Avg. = Batting average; HR = Home runs; RBI = Runs batted in

Pitching

Starting pitchers 
Note: G = Games pitched; IP = Innings pitched; W = Wins; L = Losses; ERA = Earned run average; SO = Strikeouts

Other pitchers 
Note: G = Games pitched; IP = Innings pitched; W = Wins; L = Losses; ERA = Earned run average; SO = Strikeouts

Relief pitchers 
Note: G = Games pitched; W = Wins; L = Losses; SV = Saves; ERA = Earned run average; SO = Strikeouts

Awards and honors 

All-Star Game

Farm system 

LEAGUE CHAMPIONS: Fresno

References

External links
 1974 San Francisco Giants at Baseball Reference
 1974 San Francisco Giants at Baseball Almanac

San Francisco Giants seasons
San Francisco Giants season
San Fran